Tomás Andrés Guzmán Gaytán, known as Tomás Guzmán, (born 7 March 1982 in Asunción) is a retired Paraguayan football striker.

Club career

Guzmán joined the Juventus youth system, one of the best youth systems in the world, from Presidente Hayes. In March 2002 he was handed a start against Arsenal in the UEFA Champions League due to Juventus rotating their squad having already qualified for the next round. Juventus won 1–0. He was then loaned out in 2002 to gain experience at Ternana. For the 2003–04 season, he was again loaned out, but this time to Messina. After Messina were promoted to Serie A, Juventus opted to loan him out to Serie B side Crotone. After a successful year with Crotone he was loaned out to Serie A side Siena for the 2005–06 Serie A season, along with several other Juventus players such as Nicola Legrottaglie, and Matteo Paro. When Juventus were relegated to Serie B for the Calciopoli scandal in 2006, Guzmán re-joined the Old Lady in their quest to return to the Italian top flight and signed a contract extension to June 2010. At Juventus, Guzmán had the oppritunity to work alongside fellow strikers and world champions Alessandro Del Piero and David Trezeguet, along with Marcelo Zalayeta, Valeri Bojinov, Raffaele Palladino, and Sebastian Giovinco. After not finding much playing time at Juventus, he was loaned out to Spezia for the remainder of the 2006–07 Serie B season. After a decent time with Spezia, he was farmed to Piacenza Calcio for the 2007–08 Serie B season, in co-ownership deal.

International career
Guzmán played for Paraguay at the 2001 FIFA World Youth Championship.

References

External links

1982 births
Living people
Sportspeople from Asunción
Paraguayan footballers
Paraguay under-20 international footballers
Paraguayan expatriate footballers
Juventus F.C. players
Ternana Calcio players
A.C.R. Messina players
F.C. Crotone players
A.C.N. Siena 1904 players
Spezia Calcio players
Piacenza Calcio 1919 players
A.S. Gubbio 1910 players
Club Olimpia footballers
12 de Octubre Football Club players
Club Sportivo San Lorenzo footballers
Serie A players
Serie B players
Paraguayan Primera División players
Expatriate footballers in Italy
Paraguayan expatriate sportspeople in Italy
Association football forwards
Club Presidente Hayes footballers